Tropical Fantasy is a 1962 album by French composer Michel Magne, credited to "Michel Magne et son grand orchestre." It was released in France by Bel Air records and in the United States (with two fewer tracks) by Columbia Records. It was reissued digitally in 2012.

The album was recorded at Barclay-Hoche Studios.

Background 
Although Magne is known primarily as a film composer, Tropical Fantasy is not his first, or his only, album of original music. In 1956, Magne released Musique pour films, which, despite the title, consisted entirely of music not written for films. And in 1959, "Michel Magne et son grand orchestre à cordes" released Paris, an easy listening album of music divided into four musical eras (1900, 1925, 1935, and 1955). In the same year, showing himself to be a pioneer of the genre, he released an album of electronic music, Musique tachiste.

In 1962, the year Tropical Fantasy was released, Magne was nominated for an Academy Award for Best Original Score, for his score for the Gene Kelly film Gigot.

Reception 

In a 4.5-star review for AllMusic, Jason Ankeny called it "one of the most unique and daring records in the exotica canon," while Billboard said it had "more gusto" than Martin Denny.

Geoff Alexander, in his 2019 book America Goes Hawaiian, wrote that Magne "included elements of musique concretète…. and he surprisingly created a seamless pastiche that may never be equalled, in terms of its orchestral complexity."

Space Age Pop Music said that "Magne manages to cram together into one album virtually all there is to love about space age pop music."

Track listing

French version

US version

References

External links 
Discogs master release page

1962 albums
Exotica albums